The Yeongsan Sin clan or Yeongsan Shin clan is one of the Korean clans. Their Bon-gwan (clan location) is in Changnyeong County, South Gyeongsang Province. According to some of the most recent research as of 2015, the number of members in the Yeongsan Sin clan was 187426.

Origin
The founder of the Yeongsan Sin clan was Sin Gyeong via the Xin sect. Sin Gyeong was a descendant of Yu Shen, the son of King Qi of Xia. Hailing from the Longxi Commandery, Sin Gyeong entered Goryeo as one of the Eight Scholars of the Northern Song Dynasty. He passed the Imperial examination in 1138 and was appointed as Jinzi Guanglu Daifu and munha sirang pyeongjangsa. Sin Gyeong settled in Yeongchwisan, in Changnyeong County, where he founded the Yeongsan Sin clan.

See also 
 Foreign clans in Korean

References 

 
Korean clan names of Chinese origin
Sin clans